Fred Daspit (c. 1931 - July 8, 2014) was an American artist and academic. He taught art and architecture at the University of Louisiana at Lafayette, and he authored three books about the antebellum architecture of Louisiana.

Works

References

1930s births
2014 deaths
People from St. Martinville, Louisiana
University of Louisiana at Lafayette faculty
Louisiana State University faculty
American architectural historians
Historians from Louisiana